Penobscot Valley Country Club is a golf course in Orono, Maine designed by Donald Ross in 1924. In September 2017, the club was taken over by Penobscot Valley CC LLC. & operated by Resurrection Golf, a Maine-based golf course ownership & management company.  A brand new clubhouse was built in 2001. The club has played host to many regional amateur tournaments, and in 2009 hosted the North Atlantic Conference Men's Golf Championship.

References

External links
Golf Course Website

Golf clubs and courses in Maine
Buildings and structures in Orono, Maine
Tourist attractions in Penobscot County, Maine
1924 establishments in Maine